Parliamentary elections were held in Finland on 1 and 2 July 1948.

Background
The political atmosphere during the July 1948 Finnish parliamentary elections was heated.  Many Finns across the party lines believed that the Communists and People's Democrats had pursued their goal of making Finland a solidly left-wing country too vigorously.  They had even held the Prime Ministership since March 1946, with Mauno Pekkala serving in that position.  They had organized many mass meetings, demanded the dismissal of "reactionary" (especially right-wing) civil servants and claimed that the Finnish government had to adopt even a friendlier relationship with the Soviet Union.  They had vigorously supported the imprisonment of eight former top politicians, including former President Ryti, for "war guilt" (making decisions that resulted in the Continuation War of 1941 to 1944 between Finland, the Soviet Union and Germany).  In the spring of 1948, there were even unproven rumours of an imminent coup attempt by the Finnish Communists.  Some Finnish war veterans condemned the Communist Interior Minister Yrjö Leino for deporting to the Soviet Union Ingrian Finns, East Karelians and Estonians who had bravely fought in the Finnish army during the Continuation War.  The controversy over the treatment of these "prisoners of Leino", several of whom were Finnish citizens forced Leino to resign in May 1948.  The Social Democrats election slogan was:  "Enough Already:  Price Hikes, Lying Promises, Opinion Terror and Forced Democracy."  The Agrarian election slogan was:  "On These Leans the Agrarian Union" under the Bible and the Finnish law.  The National Coalitioners declared simply:  "Be Free."  These traditional democratic parties gained a total of 16 deputies in the election, while the Communists lost 11, compared to the 1945 election.  After the election, the Finnish politics began to stabilize.  The United States appreciated Finland's desire to remain a Western democracy, despite its close relationship with the Soviet Union, symbolized by the Friendship, Co-operation and Mutual Assistance Treaty (FCMA), which was signed in April 1948.  After these parliamentary elections, the Social Democrats formed a minority government under Prime Minister Karl-August Fagerholm. They did not want to form a government with the Agrarians, claimed the late veteran Agrarian-Centrist politician Johannes Virolainen, because they feared that they would lose votes to the Communists in the next election.  The Agrarians quietly supported Fagerholm's government.

Results

References

General elections in Finland
Finland
Parliament
Finland
Election and referendum articles with incomplete results